Brooks Cryder (born January 13, 1955 in Philadelphia, Pennsylvania) is a retired American soccer defender who played professionally in the American Soccer League, North American Soccer League and Major Indoor Soccer League.

Cryder graduated from Roxborough High School. He spent at least one season, 1975, with the Philadelphia Textile soccer team.  Drafted by the Philadelphia Atoms of the North American Soccer League in 1976, Cryder elected instead to play for the Tacoma Tides of the American Soccer League. He played the 1977 season with the Los Angeles Skyhawks. In 1978, Cryder signed with the Philadelphia Fury of the North American Soccer League.  That fall, he also signed with the Cleveland Force of the Major Indoor Soccer League.  He also played for the Pennsylvania Stoners.

References

External links

 NASL/MISL stats

1955 births
Soccer players from Philadelphia
American soccer players
American Soccer League (1933–1983) players
Cleveland Force (original MISL) players
Living people
Los Angeles Skyhawks players
Major Indoor Soccer League (1978–1992) players
North American Soccer League (1968–1984) players
Pennsylvania Stoners players
Philadelphia Rams soccer players
Philadelphia Fury (1978–1980) players
Tacoma Tides players
Association football defenders